The Pelew flying fox (Pteropus pelewensis) is a species of megabat in the genus Pteropus found in the Palau Islands. A subspecies found on Yap, the Yap flying fox, is considered as a separate species by some authorities.  The species is listed as vulnerable by the IUCN due to commercial and small-scale hunting; commercial hunting for the species was banned in 1994, but local exploitation is commonplace.  The species is listed on CITES appendix I.

References

Pteropus
Mammals described in 1908
Bats of Oceania
Taxa named by Knud Andersen
Endemic fauna of Palau